MSAS  may refer to:

Multi-functional Satellite Augmentation System
Mansfield and Sutton Astronomical Society
 Marine Study Aquatic Society
Mexborough and Swinton Astronomical Society
 Microsoft Analysis Services

See also
MSA (disambiguation)